Mubariz Mansimov (legally Mubariz Gurbanoghlu; born March 22, 1968) is an Azerbaijani entrepreneur, who is the founder of Palmali Group of Companies, a major shipping company, as well of the Azerbaijani football club Khazar Lankaran. He became a naturalized Turkish citizen in 2006. He has invested heavily in Turkey and once owned Yalikavak Marina, previously named Palmarina Yalikavak. As of 15 March 2020, he has been arrested in Turkey on allegations based around having a link to Gülen movement.

Early life
Mansimov was born in Masallı, Azerbaijan in 1968, to a working-class family. He graduated from the Naval Academy in Baku. He was also a former sailor and he still owns some antique weapons consisting of more than 400 pieces, which are displayed in his offices in Istanbul.

Business career
Mansimov's Palmali Group of Companies comprises television channel "Palhaber" and radio "PAL FM" & PAL STATION.

He also owns the nationally successful Azerbaijani football club Khazar Lankaran, which has made an important contribution to the local region.
Also he has a milk company named PALSUD.

Trivia
 He is also known to be a fan of Beşiktaş.

References

External links
 Palmali Group of Companies Official Site
 Khazar Lankaran Official Site 

1968 births
Living people
Businesspeople from Baku
Azerbaijani billionaires
Azerbaijani investors
Azerbaijani humanitarians